The Ipswich SuperSprint was an annual motor racing event for Supercars, held at Queensland Raceway near Ipswich, Queensland. The event was a regular part of the Supercars Championship—and its previous incarnations, the Shell Championship Series and V8 Supercars Championship—from 1999 to 2019.

Format
The event was staged over a three-day weekend, from Friday to Sunday. Four thirty-minute practice sessions were held, two on Friday and   one each on Saturday and Sunday. Saturday featured a three-stage knockout qualifying session which decided the grid positions for the following 120 kilometre sprint race. Sunday featured a repeat of the Saturday qualifying format with a longer 200 km race distance following.

History

Queensland Raceway opened in 1999 and immediately joined the championship calendar, taking over from Lakeside Raceway as the home of the series in Queensland. In 1999 and 2000 the event hosted both a sprint round and the Queensland 500 endurance event, the first circuit to host multiple rounds in one year since Lakeside held two rounds in 1991. In the inaugural sprint event, Garth Tander scored his first career round win despite not winning a race during the weekend. He was originally declared the winner of the third race when John Bowe was disqualified for passing under a yellow flag, but Bowe was later reinstated in the results. The sprint event was dropped for 2001 with only the endurance event remaining on the calendar.

The 500-kilometre Supercars endurance race returned to Sandown Raceway in 2003 and Queensland Raceway returned to hosting a sprint round of the championship. In the aftermath of the 2004 event, round winner Marcos Ambrose was disqualified due to the discovery of an additional wire in the ECU wiring loom. The points were later reinstated on appeal. Jason Richards had a major accident during the 2005 event, after a touch from Paul Morris sent Richards' car over a kerb and into a series of rollovers. Garth Tander dominated the event in 2006 and 2007, winning five of the six races across the two years, before Mark Winterbottom won consecutive events in 2008, at which James Courtney won his first championship race, and 2009.

Craig Lowndes won five consecutive races at the event across 2011 and 2012, while Chaz Mostert won his first championship race during the 2013 event. Lowndes went on to win the event again in 2014 and 2016 to leave him with a record seven event wins at the circuit, six sprint rounds and the 2000 Queensland 500. Queensland Raceway was not included on the calendar for the 2020 Supercars Championship, the first year the circuit was not included, as either a sprint or endurance event, since it was opened in 1999.

The circuit was later considered for a substitute place on both the 2020 and 2021 calendars due to the disruption caused by the COVID-19 pandemic, however in both years the plan did not come to fruition.

Winners

Notes
  – In 1999 and 2000, Queensland Raceway also hosted a second championship round, the Queensland 500.

Multiple winners

By driver

By team

By manufacturer

Notes
  – Prodrive Racing Australia was known as Ford Performance Racing from 2003 to 2014, hence their statistics are combined.
  – DJR Team Penske was known as Dick Johnson Racing from 1980 to 2014, hence their statistics are combined.

Event names and sponsors
 1999–2000, 2004: Queensland Raceway
 2003: BigPond 300
 2005, 2007: Queensland 300
 2006: BigPond 400
 2008: City of Ipswich 400
 2009: Queensland House and Land.com 300
 2010: City of Ipswich 300
 2011–12: Coates Hire Ipswich 300
 2013: Coates Hire Ipswich 360
 2014: Coates Hire Ipswich 400
 2015: Coates Hire Ipswich Super Sprint
 2016–18: Coates Hire Ipswich SuperSprint
 2019: Century Batteries Ipswich SuperSprint

See also
 Queensland 500
 List of Australian Touring Car Championship races

References

Motorsport in Queensland
Sport in Ipswich, Queensland